AOP alliance

Organisations 
 Aama Odisha Party, political party, India
 Association of Optometrists, a British trade association
 American Opera Projects
 Assembly of the Poor, an NGO network in Thailand
 Association of Photographers, a British trade association
 Australian Orangutan Project
 Army of the Potomac, the major Union Army in the Eastern Theater of the American Civil War.

Science, mathematics and technology 
 An abbreviation of prebediolone acetate (21-acetoxypregnenolone)
 Advanced oxidation process
 Adverse outcome pathway, to adverse effects in biology
 Agent-oriented programming
 All one polynomial
 Annals of Probability, a mathematics journal
 Apnea of prematurity
 Argument of periapsis, an orbital element of an object in a star's orbit (for sun orbit, 'Argument of perihelion')
 Aspect-oriented programming
 Attribute-oriented programming
 AOP (IRC), AutoOp, an Internet Relay chat access level

Food
 Appellation d'origine protégée (protected designation of origin), a quality label of the European Union
 Appellation d'origine protégée, a food certification of Switzerland

Other
 AŌP, a Japanese idol group
 Age of Persuasion, a Canadian radio programme
 The Authors of Pain, a professional wrestling tag team
 Air Observation Post, artillery spotter aircraft
 Apocalypse of Peter, a New Testament apocryphal text.
 Annual Operations Plan, part of Sales and operations planning